Group C of the 2011 FIFA Women's World Cup consisted of the teams from the United States, North Korea, Colombia and Sweden. The games were played on 28 June, 2 July and 6 July 2011. The top two teams advanced to the knockout stage.

Standings

Matches

Colombia vs Sweden

United States vs North Korea

North Korea vs Sweden

United States vs Colombia

Sweden vs United States

North Korea vs Colombia

References

External links
Group C on fifa.com

Group B
Group
2011 in Colombian football
Group
2011 in North Korean football